"1:a gången" is a song written by Magnus Uggla and Anders Henriksson, and originally recorded by Uggla on his 1993 album Alla får påsar. The song is written from a perspective where the singer talks to a young girl, telling her to not hurry growing up, because it will still happen. The lyrics are about Uggla's daughter Agnes when she longed to grow up.<ref>Klassiska mästerverk album lines, Magnus Uggla, 2002</ref>

Miss Li recorded the song for season 3 of the Swedish show Så mycket bättre and her version also appeared on the show's official compilation album. It subsequently appeared on her own studio album Wolves. Her version also peaked at number 19 on the Swedish singles chart.

In 2013, the song was recorded by the Drifters on the album Jukebox''.

Charts

Miss Li version

References 

1993 singles
Songs written by Magnus Uggla
Magnus Uggla songs
Swedish-language songs
1993 songs
Songs written by Anders Henriksson (record producer)
Miss Li songs
Drifters (Swedish band) songs